The Dark Knight: Original Motion Picture Soundtrack is the soundtrack album to the 2008 film of the same name, which is a sequel to Christopher Nolan's 2005 film Batman Begins. The soundtrack was released on July 15, 2008, in three editions: CD, limited edition CD digipak, and digital download. The 2-CD Special Edition was released on December 9, along with the DVD. A limited edition 180-gram vinyl LP was released on August 12. The soundtrack was composed by Batman Begins collaborators Hans Zimmer and James Newton Howard and recorded in April.

Just like Batman Begins and later The Dark Knight Rises, the main motif always consists in just two notes, played by horns and accompanied by strings, representing Batman's pain and guilt.

In many tracks is also reprised Batman's main action theme ("Molossus"), first used in Batman Begins and later in The Dark Knight Rises.

Zimmer was responsible for creating Joker's theme, while James Newton Howard focused on Harvey Dent/Two-Face theme.

The score won the Grammy Award for Best Score Soundtrack for Visual Media, "Best Music" at the Saturn Awards and "Best Soundtrack" at the Brit Awards, while it was nominated in the category "Best Film Music" at the BAFTA Awards.

Composition 
Zimmer originally said the main Batman theme was purposely introduced at the end of Batman Begins, and would be fleshed out in the sequel as the character develops. Zimmer and Howard both believed that creating a heroic theme that a viewer could hum would ignore the complexity and darkness of the character. The Batman theme (audible twice early in the film, once towards the end and a final time at the beginning of the end credits) creates what Zimmer described as a "red herring", a kind of musical foreshadowing, which was played by a cello.

The nine-minute suite for the Joker ("Why So Serious") was based around two notes played by electric cello, solo violin, guitars and a string section. Zimmer compared its style to the band Kraftwerk, who come from his native Germany, as well as his work with bands like The Damned. Throughout the piece, Zimmer used razor blades on string instruments to achieve the tortured, twisted sound to accompany the character on the screen. When Ledger died, Zimmer stated that he felt like scrapping his original material and composing a new theme, but decided that to do so would compromise the "evil [performance] projects". James Newton Howard composed the "elegant and beautiful" themes for Harvey Dent/Two-Face, to work as an aural contrast. The suite contains ten thousand musical bars.

The heroic brass theme which plays when Batman leaves Ra's al Ghul to die in Batman Begins makes a reappearance when Batman hurls the Joker off the building in the film's climax. It also makes its third and final appearance in The Dark Knight Rises when Batman fires a missile at Miranda Tate, while her truck driver was killed, sending her and the truck to a crashing halt. The cue was released on the two-disc special edition, and can be found on the track, "We Are Tonight's Entertainment". The second disc can also be found for digital download under the album name The Dark Knight (Bonus Digital Release) with artwork featuring the Joker instead of Batman.

Sales 
The soundtrack debuted on the Billboard 200 list at  20, with 25,000 copies sold in the first week.
During its second week in release, the track fell to  23, with an estimated 20,000 copies sold. It dropped out of top 100 on its third week, but held the position of  192 selling 2,100. On its fourth week it fell out of the Top 200.

A 2-CD Special Edition of The Dark Knight soundtrack was released on December 9, 2008. In addition to the 14 tracks on the regular release, an additional 10 tracks of score were added to the second disc, along with four remixes by The Crystal Method, Paul van Dyk, Mel Wesson, and Ryeland Allison, packaged as a digibook in a semi-artificial leather slipcase with the Bat-Signal cut out. The Digibook features several movie scenes, production details and a few words from Christopher Nolan on the collaboration with Hans Zimmer and James Newton Howard. The first disc is exactly the same as the original release, with additional tracks and remixes on the latter disc. Between the two of them, the two discs of the special edition form most of the film's score, though the tracks are arranged in an order different from the scenes in the film.

Reception 

The score received favorable responses. Websites like tracksounds.com and Soundtrack.net have released mostly positive reviews, commending the score's blend of electronic and orchestral elements as well as its continued departure from the tone of Tim Burton's Batman and Batman Returns set by Danny Elfman. Other sites, like Movie Music UK and especially Filmtracks.com found the score to be bland and uncreative, with many elements borrowed from the previous scores of both composers, especially previous scores by Zimmer. Filmtracks.com reviewer Christian Clemmensen found the track "Why so Serious" unlistenable and referred to it as "nine minutes of your life that you'll never get back", but praised the cue "Harvey Two-Face" which was composed by James Newton Howard. Other complaints were about Batman's new heroic theme, featured most heavily in Like a Dog Chasing Cars, which Clemmensen considered "a murky blend of The Last Samurai, The Thin Red Line, The Da Vinci Code, and Crimson Tide".

Awards 
The soundtrack was awarded the Grammy Award for Best Score Soundtrack for Visual Media in February 2009. Later in May, the soundtrack won a Classical BRIT Award for Best Soundtrack. It was disqualified for consideration for that year's Oscars, as the Academy ruled there were more names listed as composers than they permit. The score won other several awards, including "Best Music" at the Saturn Awards.

Track listing 

Disc One

Disc Two- (Bonus Special Edition)

Tracks not included within the release of the soundtrack:

Chart positions

References

External links 

 The Dark Knight Soundtrack  - official website

2008 soundtrack albums
2000s film soundtrack albums
Batman film soundtracks
Hans Zimmer soundtracks
Warner Records soundtracks
The Dark Knight Trilogy